The 26th Annual Australian Recording Industry Association Music Awards (generally known as ARIA Music Awards or simply The ARIAs) were a series of award ceremonies which included the 2012 ARIA Artisan Awards, ARIA Hall of Fame Awards, ARIA Fine Arts Awards and ARIA Awards. The latter ceremony took place on 29 November at the Sydney Entertainment Centre, and was telecast on Nine Network's channel Go! at 7:30pm. The final nominees for ARIA Award categories were announced on 3 October as well as nominees and winners for Fine Arts Awards and Artisan Awards. There was no peer judged "Single of the Year" category this year due to replacing it to "Song of the Year", although the "Album of the Year" category returned. The Highest Selling Single and Album categories were removed as they were in 2010.

For the third time in ARIA Awards history, public votes were being used for the categories, "Song of the Year", "Best Australian Live Act" and "Best International Artist"; and for the first time for the category "Best Video", which was moved from the Artisan Awards. The nominees for "Song of the Year" are the ten highest selling Australian single releases during the eligibility period. Sales from different releases by the same artist cannot be aggregated, and artists are only allowed to be nominated once, even if they have more than one song in the top ten. Songs must also have been released as singles during the eligibility period. The nominees for "Best Australian Live Act" were selected by a Judging School specifically formed for the purpose. The nominees for "Best Video" were selected by the ARIA Voting Academy. The nominee pool for the "Best International Artist" was drawn from the artists whose recordings make up the top ten highest selling international releases, based on album and related single sales during the eligibility period.

The ARIA Hall of Fame inducted Yothu Yindi on 29 November at the same ceremony as the ARIA Awards.

Performers

Pre-show

Timomatic and Justice Crew – "Set It Off" / "Boom Boom"
Jessica Mauboy – "I Can't Help Myself (Sugar Pie Honey Bunch)" / "Land of a Thousand Dances"

Main show

Hilltop Hoods – "I Love It"
Guy Sebastian and Lupe Fiasco – "Battle Scars"
Missy Higgins – "Everyone's Waiting"
Yothu Yindi with Paul Kelly, Jessica Mauboy, Dan Sultan and Peter Garrett – "Treaty"
 In 2019 Dan Condon of Double J described this as one of "7 great performances from the history of the ARIA Awards."
Taylor Swift – "I Knew You Were Trouble"
The Jezabels – "Endless Summer"
360 featuring Gossling – "Boys like You"
Kimbra – "Settle Down"
The Temper Trap – "Trembling Hands"

House DJs

Havana Brown (first half of ceremony)
Ruby Rose (second half of ceremony)

Presenters

Lanie Lane and Josh Pyke – presented Best Independent Release 
Ella Hooper and Chris Cheney – presented Best Rock Album
Keiynan Lonsdale and Kate Peck - presented Best Children's Album and Best Comedy Release 
Jessica Mauboy and Josh Thomas – presented Breakthrough Artist 
Ricki-Lee and Example – presented Best Dance Release
Tom Ballard and Alex Dyson – presented Best Australian Live Act
Lee Kernaghan and Erin McNaught – presented Best Country Album and Best Blues & Roots Album
Martin Freeman, Andy Serkis and Richard Armitage – presented Best Pop Release
Nicki Minaj – presented Best Urban Album
Ryan "Fitzy" Fitzgerald and Michael "Wippa" Wipfli – presented Best International Artist
Benji Madden and Joel Madden – presented Best Group
Matty Acton and Mel Greig – presented Song of the Year
Clare Bowditch and Bob Evans - presented Best Adult Contemporary Album
Russell Brand and Barbara Elizabeth – presented Best Female Artist
Taylor Swift and Richard Wilkins – presented Best Male Artist
Russell Brand – presented Album of the Year 
Paul Kelly and Peter Garrett - inducts Yothu Yindi into the ARIA Hall Of Fame

ARIA Hall of Fame Inductee

Indigenous music group from the Northern Territory, Yothu Yindi, were inducted into the ARIA Hall of Fame. Lead singer, M. Yunupingu, reflected on their early years, "It was very different times in those days. We were black people coming into a white world that was sceptical of our people, but through our music we were able to open minds to Aboriginal Australia and where we as a race of people were going.”

Nominees and winners

ARIA Awards
Winners are listed first and highlighted in boldface.

Fine Arts Awards
Winners are listed first and highlighted in boldface.

Artisan Awards 
Winners are listed first and highlighted in boldface.

See also 
Music of Australia

Notes

References

External links 

2012 in Australian music
2012 music awards
ARIA Music Awards